Marek Rutka (born 30 May 1974) is a Polish politician. Member of the Sejm for New Left. Former Vice President of Będzin.

Electoral history

References

1974 births
Living people
People from Dąbrowa Górnicza
Members of the Polish Sejm 2019–2023